OpenVanilla (OV) is a free, open-source text-entry (input method) and processing architecture, and includes a collection of popular input methods and text processing filters. It serves as a bridge between input methods and the operating system. It was originally designed to offer a better text-entry experience and alternative input methods not found in Apple's built-in set or suit better the needs for Windows "switchers." However, the developers have since worked on a Microsoft Windows port and a bridge between OV and SCIM on the X Window System. The macOS version is compatible with Mac OS X 10.3 (Panther) and Mac OS X 10.4 (Tiger). OV's input methods can also be used through SCIM on Linux or FreeBSD. An experimental Win32 Unicode version is also available.

History and development
The motivation for OpenVanilla was for to fill an oversight in commercially available software.

Apple was slow to localize its operating system for the Chinese market. In 1987, three years after launching Macintosh, Apple produced a Chinese version of its Finder (then the improper name of its later renamed "Mac OS"), Chinese Talk. There were several competing alternatives, but these never gained traction. However, Apple's Chinese Talk and later its Chinese version of Mac OS had a serious shortcoming: although several Chinese input methods were offered, one of them — the Phonetic "Zhuyin" method — lacked the Eten Layout, which more closely emulates Chinese phonetics.

In the mid-1980s, prior to the globalization of computing and software distribution, new computer users learned the Eten Layout as their first (and often only) way of transcribing Chinese characters. Without support for the Eten Layout on the Apple OS, Microsoft maintained a substantial customer base, especially in Taiwan, because the phonetic method in Windows included the Eten Layout as an optional configuration.

Apple's Mac OS X, launched in 2002, received negative feedback after another popular input method, Cangjie, was substantially modified, prompting complaints that the method in OS X was too unfamiliar, compared to that of OS 9.

In 2003, developer clkao (Chia-liang Kao) ported Chewing, a popular Chinese input method in Linux/FreeBSD world, to OS X. Using Xcode, a development tool included with OS X, it became possible to build customized input methods on OS X. clkao'''s port is called ChewingOSX and was transferred to gugod (Kang-ming Liu) and zonble (Weizhong Yang) in 2004 for further maintenance.

The success of these developers inspired another, lukhnos, to create VanillaInput, a phonetic input method that supports the Eten Layout, in July 2004. A month later, Cangjie support was also added, overcoming the perceived challenges of OS X.

Prior to these advancements, the focus of large OS producers, such as Apple, did not generally include input method support for minority languages. As a repercussion of the developments surrounding Chewing and VanillaInput, the design of new Chinese input methods was opened for further exploration. Yet, regarding the writing of an IM, many parts (libraries, for example) were still not "open" source.

In October 2004, lukhnos, gugod, zonble and b6s'' began to develop a new IM framework, OpenVanilla, designed on Mac OS X, but intended for implementation beyond OS X. The intention was to create a minimalist and clean design with the goal of helping users write their own IM with minimal C++ knowledge, and independent of the operating platform.

Holo and POJ input method
Holo is an example of a language that can be aided by OpenVanilla. Holo is a language spoken by more than approximately 70% of the Taiwanese population. It is the de facto majority language (even though 95% of the people speak and read Mandarin, the official language, to varying competence and extent), but it lacks the same social standing as Mandarin. One contributing factor to this inequality is that it is not used in information processing, because a proper, fully functioning input method for it was not offered by major OS publishers.

A foundation upon which to build an input method for Holo exists. POJ (Pe̍h-ōe-jī) is the de facto romanization standard for the Holo language spoken in Taiwan. In use for over 150 years, POJ was used to publish a Holo Bible and many other important texts. In addition, the transcription of Holo shares similarities with Japanese: the written language can be represented in various ways (in syllabic forms or in ideographic forms). Holo can be written in either Romanized form (Pe̍h-ōe-jī) or in Chinese/Han characters. A standard IME for Japanese exists, in which text is entered phonetically, and then converted by the IME to be presented in various final forms: hiragana, katakana, kanji, or romaji. Conceivably, an analogous system could be developed for Holo using the same principles.

Demo movie

This screenshot demonstrates the different "layers" of a functional POJ input method. A better Holo input method should evolve further into the "phrase" layer, in which phrases could be automatically interpreted, and users would not be required to explicitly assign tones for each syllable.

Future
OpenVanilla is still in its nascent stage. Currently a preliminary implementation is done using rapid prototyping techniques and Objective-C++. To make it platform-independent and more accommodating, it needs to re-implemented. Aside from the Objective-C part that pertains mostly to data structure, OpenVanilla's POJ IM module is a pure algorithm code that deals exclusively with keyboard mapping and syllable transformation without a user interface code, so as not to require an IM developer to possess in-depth knowledge of its inner workings.

See also
 Input method editor
 Chinese input methods for computers
 Cangjie input method
 Keyboard layouts of Traditional Chinese input methods
 Zhuyin (BoPoMoFo)
 Smart Common Input Method

References

External links
 OpenVanilla Official Site
 The paper "OpenVanilla – A Non-Intrusive Plug-In Framework of Text Services"
 Chewing input method
 ChewingOSX
 SpaceChewingOSX
 VanillaInput

Input/output
Input methods
Han character input